The KARTA Center or The KARTA Center Foundation is a Polish non-governmental public benefit organization, whose aim is documenting and popularizing the recent history of Poland and history of Eastern Europe and strengthening tolerance and democracy.

History of the KARTA Center Foundation
The KARTA community founded in 1982 in Warsaw during the time of martial law in Poland as an illegal underground paper, named Karta, focusing on political commentaries (19 issues), which was transformed after a few months into an independent almanac presenting human attitudes towards dictatorship (seven issues). In 1987 the Karta editorial team initiated the foundation of the independent Eastern Archive - a social movement documenting the concealed and distorted "Eastern" past (with nearly 200 people organized in 12 branches all over Poland in one year). Since 1990 Incorporation of the Eastern Archive Foundation and the KARTA Foundation had been cooperated closely with each other. In 1991 the KARTA Center founded combining all branches of both Foundations. In 1992 started the KARTA Center its international activities by "The Conscience Week in Poland", a meeting in Warsaw with 54 members of the Memorial Association (Russia, Ukraine). In 1996 the two Foundations merged. The objective of new KARTA Center Foundation was to "promote and strengthen tolerance and democracy". In 1996 there was the final of the first competition for high school students, the so-called "History at Hand".

The KARTA Center Foundation is a book and magazine publisher, organizes many exhibitions and educational events, and acts as an archive for documents. The KARTA Center co-founded in 2001 the EUSTORY, the European network of organizers of history competition in Europe, and take part in summer schools, autumn academies and General Assemblies. In 2005 KARTA initiated the History Meeting House in Warsaw with a permanent multimedia exhibition "The Faces of Totalitarianism", in the same year the launch of the Learning from history site. It is the center promoting the 20th century history, a place of educational and opinion-forming activities in Warsaw, Poland and internationally. Since March 2006 the History Meeting House is a local government cultural institution.

Focal points of the KARTA Center Foundation

Retaining the past 
The KARTA Center Foundation is collecting the oral and written statements and documents:

Oral-History-Team 
The oral-history-team records interviews and collects written statements about people experiences. The aim of the program is to record, archive and make available biographic accounts of the 20th century history witnesses.

Documents Emergency Service 
The team of the documents emergency service  helps to rescue the documents or to exhibit the documents to the publicity.

Archives and collections 
The KARTA Center Foundation curates its archives and collections: 
 the Eastern Archive 1901-56,
 the Index of the Repressed 1939-56  - part of the Eastern Archive,
 the Opposition Archive 1956-89,
 the Archive of Victims of the Polish-Ukrainian Conflicts in the 40th of the 20th century,
 the photographic archive and
 the oral history archive.  Most of the databases and archives of “Karta” are available online.

Popularizing the history

Exhibitions and educational events 
The KARTA Center Foundation organizes exhibitions and educational events in the „History Meeting House“

Books and magazines 
The KARTA Center Foundation publishes books and magazines, e.g. quarterly journal „Karta“ and selling them in the Internet.

Historic competitions 
The KARTA Center organizes competition for pupils „History at Hand“ – projects of pupils based on history of everyday live and experiences of people in the 20th century. The competition is a part of the EUSTORY network.

Historic Websites 
The KARTA Center Foundation develops and manages Websites on historic topic: „Learning from the history“ (since 2005) and „The 20th century“ (since 2009).

Networking with European NGOs to popularize history 
The KARTA Center Foundation co-founded in 2001 the EUSTORY, the European network of history competition organizers from 20 European countries, established by the Körber Foundation of Hamburg, and takes part in summer schools, autumn academies and General Assemblies.

Awards
 1990 - Award of the Association of Polish Journalists - for new way of writing about the contemporary history
 2001 - Certificate of the Polish Foreign Minister for promotion of Poland abroad
 2001 - Saint-George-Award of "Tygodnik Powszechny" for the campaign against the misremember
 2002 - Jerzy-Giedroyc-Award of the newspaper "Rzeczpospolita"
 2002 - Grand Prix in "Pro Publico Bono" for the best civil initiative in Poland
 2005 - Award of the Office for War Veterans and Victims of Oppression
 2008 - Award of Memoria Iustorum for the supporting of Polish-Ukrainian dialogue
 2008 - Award in "Pro Publico Bono" for the supporting of the civil society in Poland
 2009 - Grand Prix in "Pro Publico Bono" for the best civil initiative of the last 20 years of the independent Poland

See also
 History Meeting House

External links
Homepage
EUSTORY

Organizations established in 1982
Polish educational societies
History organisations based in Poland
1982 establishments in Poland